The 1979 Vuelta a España was the 34th edition of the Vuelta a España, one of cycling's Grand Tours. The Vuelta began in Jerez de la Frontera, with a prologue individual time trial on 24 April, and Stage 11 occurred on 5 May with a stage from Zaragoza. The race finished in Madrid on 13 May.

Stage 11
5 May 1979 — Zaragoza to Pamplona,

Stage 12
6 May 1979 — Pamplona to Logroño,

Stage 13

Stage 14
8 May 1979 — Torrelavega to Gijón,

Stage 15
9 May 1979 — Gijón to León,

Stage 16a
10 May 1979 — León to Valladolid,

Stage 16b
10 May 1979 — Valladolid to Valladolid,  (ITT)

Stage 17
11 May 1979 — Valladolid to Ávila,

Stage 18a
12 May 1979 — Ávila to Colmenar Viejo,

Stage 18b
12 May 1979 — Colmenar Viejo to Azuqueca de Henares,

Stage 19
13 May 1979 — Madrid to Madrid,

References

1979 Vuelta a España
Vuelta a España stages